Switched at Birth is a 1991 American miniseries directed by Waris Hussein. It is based on the true story of Kimberly Mays and Arlena Twigg, babies switched soon after birth in a Florida hospital in 1978. NBC aired the production as a two-part miniseries over two consecutive nights on April 28, 1991.

Plot
Within days of Arlena Twigg's birth in Florida in late 1978, she is found to have a chronic illness. Blood tests reveal that she is not the biological daughter of Regina and Ernest Twigg. Arlena is ill throughout her life and dies at the age of nine. Subsequently, her parents search for their biological daughter, who they find is being raised as Kimberly Mays by a man who believes that he is her father.

Cast
 Bonnie Bedelia as Regina Twigg
 Brian Kerwin as Robert "Bob" Mays
 John M. Jackson as Ernest Twigg
 Eve Gordon as Darlena
 Jacqueline Scott as Ruth Mays
 Judith Hoag as Barbara Mays
 Caroline McWilliams as Lois Morehead
 Lois Smith as Margaret Hill
 Kelli Williams as Irisa
 Ariana Richards as Kimberly Mays, Age 9-11
 Erika Flores as Arlena Twigg, Age 9
 Ed Asner as Ted Marx
 Beth Grant as Sophie
 Rance Howard as Frank Hill
 Vivian Bonnell as Nurse Ford
 Allison Mack as Normia Twigg

Factual basis
Kimberly Mays and Arlena Twigg were born within a few days of each other in a Wauchula, Florida hospital in November 1978. Kimberly went home with Bob Mays and his wife Barbara, who died of ovarian cancer when Kimberly was three. Ernest and Regina Twigg of Sebring, Florida took home the Mays' biological daughter, whom they named Arlena. The Twiggs learned that Arlena had the wrong blood type to be their biological daughter when she was nine years old. Following Arlena's death from a heart condition, the Twiggs sought information about their biological daughter and located Kimberly Mays, who became the subject of a custody battle between her biological parents and Bob Mays, the man who raised her after she was switched at birth. Bob Mays had agreed in 1989 to grant the Twiggs visitation rights to Kimberly, but he later cut off the visits. The Twiggs then sued for increased visitation or custody of Kimberly. A Wauchula circuit court ruled in 1993 that Kimberly would be allowed to cut off all contacts with her biological family and that Bob Mays was her psychological father. Though Kimberly won the right to stay with Bob Mays, she later ran away and moved in with the Twiggs.

In a 2015 interview with Barbara Walters for the documentary series American Scandals on Investigation Discovery, Kimberly discussed her troubled early adulthood, two divorces, six children, losing custody of her firstborn to her first husband, living in her car with one child, and working as a stripper to buy food for her children.

The court battle was also the subject of a book entitled The Baby Swap Conspiracy by Loretta Schwarz-Nobel.

See also
Switched at Birth (1999 film)
Switched at Birth (TV series)

References

External links
 
 Switched at birth, movie trailer

1991 television films
1991 films
Films scored by Marvin Hamlisch
American films based on actual events
Films directed by Waris Hussein
Films set in Florida
Films set in the 1970s
Films set in the 1980s
American drama television films
1990s English-language films
1990s American films